Kaori Heat Treatment Co., Ltd. (8996) was founded in 1970 with the mission to promote green energy. It is the only business in Taiwan that is concurrently involved in the "use, conservation, and generation of energy." Today, Kaori has successfully established its expertise in energy conservation and environmental protection, and markets products to more than 70 countries worldwide. The Company's operating headquarters is located at No. 5-2, Jilin North Road, Zhongli District, Taoyuan City; it has a total of 6 production sites, including Zhongli 1st Plant, Zhongli 2nd Plant, Zhongli 3rd Plant, Zhongli Ziqiang Plant, Kaohsiung Benzhou Plant, and Zhejiang Ningbo Plant. All of the group's core business activities revolve around energy conservation and green energy, whereas the main products include plate heat exchangers and critical components for stationary SOFC. Kaori also controls two main technologies: immersion liquid cooling and hydrogen power, that can be used to support the next generation of low-carbon solutions and drive industry upgrades for conformity with the world's net zero, environmental, and sustainability trends.

Only a sustainable business is able to sustain service. In November 2021, Kaori assembled an "ESG Committee" to enforce sustainability awareness and values and to take charge of sustainability tasks within the Company. Driven by a conviction toward "low carbon, people value, and sustainable practice," the Company not only applies its core technologies, resources, capabilities, and advantages to Environment, Social, and Governance aspects, but also takes the initiative to incorporate ESG values into operating procedures, so that the Company may develop sustainable practices in a more systematic and organized manner. 

Main products and services

Kaori's key products include brazed plate heat exchanger, gasket plate heat exchanger, key components for SOFC fuel cell, immersion cooling tanks and elements, single/two phase immersion cooling tank, liquid cooling cabinet modules, methanol fuel cell system, methanol hydrogen generator, organic solvent hydrocracking, purification of industrial waste hydrogen, and methanol-based thermal technology.

References
KAORI 2021 Sustainability Report
Manufacturing companies of Taiwan
Manufacturing companies established in 1970
1970 establishments in Taiwan